Tom Tom Blues is the title of The 77s' eighth album, released in 1995 on the Brainstorm Artists, Intl label.

Track listing 

 "Rocks In Your Head"
 "Honesty"
 "You Still Love Me"
 "Outskirts"
 "Flowers In the Sand"
 "Don't Leave Me Long"
 "Gravy Train"
 "Five In the Nave"
 "Earache"
 "Deliverance"

Personnel 

The band
 Mike Roe – guitars, lead vocals
 Mark Harmon – bass guitar, background vocals
 Bruce Spencer – drums

Additional musicians
 Carey Avery – percussion

Production notes
 Gene Eugene – executive producer
 Ojo Taylor – executive producer
 Guy Niosi – engineer, mixing
 John Flanagan – engineer, mixing
 Rachel Thornton – cover illustration

References

1995 albums
The 77s albums